Mustafa Chike-Obi is the current Chairman of Fidelity Bank Nigeria and was an economic adviser to Atiku Abubakar Campaign Organisation for Nigeria's 2019 presidential election. He was the inaugural Managing Director and Chief Executive Officer of Asset Management Corporation of Nigeria (“AMCON”) from 2010 – 2015
AMCON was established pursuant to the Asset Management Corporation of Nigeria Act no. 4,
2010 on the 19th day of July 2010, for the purpose of efficiently resolving the non-performing
loan assets of banks in Nigeria. During his 5-year tenure as MD/CEO of AMCON, Mustafa Chike-Obi performed creditably and won many accolades and admiration from stakeholders in Nigeria's Banking and Financial services industry. He is currently Executive Vice-Chairman of Alpha African Advisory Limited.

Education 
Chike-Obi earned a First Class Bachelor's degree in Mathematics from University of Lagos and an MBA from Stanford University Graduate School of Business.

Career
Mustafa Chike-Obi started off his Nigerian Banking career with Chase Merchant Bank from 1980 – 1982 as Head of Treasury Department.
It is noteworthy that Mustafa Chike-Obi created the Treasure Department concept in Nigerian banking and headed the first such
department in Nigeria – Treasury Departments are now a critical part of Nigeria’s banking industry.
Mustafa Chike-Obi later moved to Goldman Sachs where he worked as Co-Head Trading, Mortgage-Backed Securities. Furthermore, he founded Madison Park Advisors, a financial service advisory and consulting firm specializing in hedge fund and private equity investment - located in New Jersey, U.S.A. He was also Managing Director of Shoreline Group from 2001 – 2006. Mustafa Chike-Obi worked with Bear Stearns & Co as Co-Head Emerging Markets Trading 1992 – 1995.
On 6th July 2020, he was appointed as chairman Fidelity bank Nigeria PLC. Fidelity Bank has announced the appointment of Mustafa Chike-Obi as Chairman of the Board of Directors. The appointment has been approved by the Central Bank of Nigeria, and will take effect on August 14, 2020, after the expiration of the tenure of the current Chairman, Mr Ernest Ebi.

References

Nigerian investors
Nigerian chairpersons of corporations
University of Lagos alumni
Stanford Graduate School of Business alumni
Year of birth missing (living people)
Living people
Place of birth missing (living people)